Pisonia graciliscens is a species of plant in the Nyctaginaceae family. It is endemic to French Polynesia.

References

Flora of French Polynesia
graciliscens
Critically endangered plants
Taxonomy articles created by Polbot